Sally Carman-Duttine is an English actress. She is known for portraying the roles of Kelly Maguire in the Channel 4 comedy-drama series Shameless (2005–2013), and Abi Franklin in the ITV soap opera Coronation Street (2017–present).

Early and personal life 
Carman was born in Mexborough, South Yorkshire. At 18 she attended the LAMDA drama school in London.

Carman discovered Reiki while filming Shameless, and subsequently trained at the Oldham Reiki Network. In March 2014 she started as a therapist at Buddah Beauty, a holistic therapy salon in Chorlton.

Career 
Carman made her major television debut in 2000 when she starred as Bridget Salsabill in British drama Bomber, though she had previously featured briefly in an episode of City Central in 1998. As an actress, she has also starred in Doctors, Heartbeat and Holby City. She also played the character of Betty Haigh, the wife of John George Haigh, in the television film A is for Acid.

In 2005 she appeared in what would be a recurring role as Kelly Maguire in Shameless. She became a more prominent character in the 2008 series, and finally a main cast member from 2009 to 2013.

In 2011, she played the character Marie in the film Tyrannosaur, written and directed by Paddy Considine.

On 28 January 2013, Carman appeared in "The Shrine" the first episode of the fourth series of Moving On as Sarah, one of the main characters.

She appeared in the second series of the BBC 1 drama Prisoners' Wives, starting 14 March 2013, as Kim Haines, the wife of a man falsely accused of child abuse.

In September 2014, she played the role of Mrs Casper, the mother of kestrel lover Billy, in Kes, a stage adaptation of Barry Hines’ book, A Kestrel for a Knave, at Cast in Doncaster, South Yorkshire.

Carman was the lead actor in Dreamers a musical play that ran at the Oldham Coliseum in July 2015.

She played DCI Sally Butcher in "River’s Edge" Parts 1 & 2, the final episodes of Silent Witness Series 19, in 2016.

In October 2017, Carman joined the cast of long-running ITV soap opera, Coronation Street. She is playing Abi Franklin, the drug-addicted mother of established teenage character, Seb Franklin (Harry Visinoni).

Awards and nominations

References

External links
 

Living people
English television actresses
English soap opera actresses
Actors from Doncaster
Actresses from Yorkshire
Year of birth missing (living people)